The University of Montana is a public research university located in Missoula, Montana.  It forms one of two state university systems within the Montana University System. "University of Montana" may also refer to one of three affiliate campuses:
 University of Montana Western in Dillon, Montana
 Montana Tech of the University of Montana in Butte, Montana
 Helena College University of Montana in Helena, Montana

See also
 Montana State University (disambiguation)